Tataf (also Romanized as Taţaf; also known as Tetev) is a village in Gurab Zarmikh Rural District, Mirza Kuchek Janghli District, Sowme'eh Sara County, Gilan Province, Iran. At the 2006 census, its population was 1,142, in 285 families.

References 

Populated places in Sowme'eh Sara County